is a railway station in the city of Yamagata, Yamagata Prefecture, Japan, operated by East Japan Railway Company (JR East).

Lines
Tateyama Station is served by the Senzan Line, and is located 54.9 rail kilometers from the terminus of the line at Sendai Station.

Station layout
The station has two opposed side platforms connected by a level crossing. The station is unattended.

Platforms

History
Tateyama Station opened on October 17, 1933. The station was absorbed into the JR East network upon the privatization of JNR on 1 April 1987. A new station building was completed in 1999.

Surrounding area
Tateyama Post Office

See also
List of railway stations in Japan

External links

 JR East Station information 

Stations of East Japan Railway Company
Railway stations in Yamagata Prefecture
Senzan Line
Railway stations in Japan opened in 1933
Yamagata, Yamagata